Sultanate of Banjar or Sultanate of Banjarmasin (Banjar: كسلطانن بنجر, Kasultanan Banjar) was a sultanate located in what is today the South Kalimantan Province of Indonesia. For most of its history, its capital was at Banjarmasin.

History 

The second king of Negara Daha, Maharaja Sukarama had four commoner wives, and four sons and one daughter. As Maharaja Sukarama followed the traditional belief of Negara Dipa requiring the king had to be of royal blood, arranged marriage of his sole daughter, Putri Galuh Baranakan and the son of his brother, Raden Bagawan, with the name Raden Mantri. The result this union (of Mantri and Galuh) will produce the ideal heir to rule Daha as they would have patrilineal and matrilineal royal blood. This union result in Raden Samudra who was prepared by Sukarama to rule.

However after Sukarama's death this succesion was challenged by his sons, Pangeran Mangkubumi dan Pangeran Tumanggung who usurped the throne. Raden Samudra, escaped from the Kingdom of Daha to the Barito River area, because his safety was in danger, and established a new kingdom at Banjarmasin. With help from Mangkubumi Aria Taranggana, Raden Samudra converted to Islam on 24 September 1526, changing his name to Sultan Suriansyah. Banjar at first paid tribute to the Sultanate of Demak. That state met its demise in the mid-16th century, however, and Banjar was not required to send tribute to new power in Java, the Sultanate of Pajang.

Banjar rose in the first decades of the 17th century as a producer and trader of pepper. Soon, virtually all of the southwest, southeast, and eastern areas of Kalimantan island were paying tribute to the sultanate. Sultan Agung of Mataram (1613-1646), who ruled north Java coastal ports such as Jepara, Gresik, Tuban, Madura and Surabaya, planned to colonise the Banjar-dominated areas of Kalimantan in 1622, but the plan was cancelled due to inadequate resources.

In the 18th century Prince Tamjidullah I successfully transferred power to his dynasty and set Prince Nata Dilaga as its first Sultan with Panembahan Kaharudin Khalilullah. Nata Dilaga became the first king of the dynasty as Tamjidullah I in 1772, on the day of his accession calling himself Susuhunan Nata Alam.

The son of Sultan Muhammad Aliuddin Aminullah named Prince Amir, a grandson of Sultan Hamidullah, fled to the Pasir, and requested the help of his uncle Arung Tarawe (and Ratu Dewi). Amir then returned and attacked the Sultanate of Banjar with a large force of Bugis people in 1757, and tried to retake the throne of Susuhunan Nata Alam. Fearing the loss of his throne and the fall of the kingdom to the Bugis, Susuhunan Nata Alam requested the assistance of the Dutch East India Company (VOC), who dispatched a force under Captain Hoffman. The combined force defeated the Bugis, sending Amir to flee back to Pasir. After a long time, he tried to meet with Barito Banjar nobles, who disliked the VOC. Following this, Amir was arrested and exiled to Sri Lanka in 1787, and Banjar became a Dutch protectorate.

The Dutch increased their presence in the 19th century, taking territory from the sultanate and interfering in the appointment of its rulers. Resistance led to the Banjarmasin War (1859–1863) and the abolition of the sultanate in 1860. Afterwards, the area was governed by regents in Martapura (Pangeran Jaya Pemenang) and in Amuntai (Raden Adipati Danu Raja). The regency was finally abolished in 1884. The last claimant to the throne died in 1905.

List of Sultans of Banjar 

 1520-1546 Sultan Suriansyah
 1546-1570 Sultan Rahmatullah bin Sultan Suriansyah
 1570-1595 Sultan Hidayatullah I bin Rahmatullah
 1595-1638 Sultan Mustain Billah bin Sultan Hidayatullah I
 1642-1647 Sultan Inayatullah bin Mustainbillah
 1647-1660 Sultan Saidullah bin Sultan Inayatullah
 1660-1663 Sultan Ri'ayatullah/Tahalidullah? bin Sultan Mustainbillah
 1663-1679 Sultan Amrullah Bagus Kasuma bin Sultan Saidullah
 1663-1679 Sultan Agung/Pangeran Suryanata II bin Sultan Inayatullah
 1679-1708 Sultan Amrullah Bagus Kasuma bin Sultan Saidullah
 1708-1717 Sultan Tahmidullah I/Sultan Surya Alam bin Sultan Tahlilullah/Sultan Amrullah
 1717-1730 Panembahan Kasuma Dilaga bin Sultan Amrullah
 1730-1734 Sultan Hamidullah/Sultan Ilhamidullah/Sultan Kuning bin Sultan Tahmidullah I
 1734-1759 Sultan Tamjidullah I bin Sultan Tahlilullah
 1759-1761 Sultan Muhammadillah/Muhammad Aliuddin Aminullah bin Sultan Il-Hamidullah/Sultan Kuning
 1761-1801 Sultan Tahmidullah II/Sultan Nata bin Sultan Tamjidullah I
 1801-1825 Sultan Sulaiman al-Mutamidullah/Sultan Sulaiman Saidullah II bin Tahmidullah II
 1825-1857 Sultan Adam Al-Watsiq Billah bin Sultan Sulaiman al-Mutamidullah
 1857-1859 Sultan Tamjidullah II al-Watsiqu Billah bin Pangeran Ratu Sultan Muda Abdur Rahman bin Sultan Adam

Resistance leaders against the Dutch

 1859-1862 Sultan Hidayatullah Khalilullah bin Pangeran Ratu Sultan Muda Abdur Rahman bin Sultan Adam
 1862      Pangeran Antasari bin Pangeran Mashud bin Sultan Amir bin Sultan Muhammad Aliuddin Aminullah
 1862-1905 Sultan Muhammad Seman bin Pangeran Antasari Panembahan Amiruddin Khalifatul Mukminin

Revival 
As of 2010, the sultanate was revived for cultural purposes in Martapura by Ir. Haji Gusti Khairul Saleh, an Indonesian politician & regent of Banjar Regency who claimed to be descendant of the royal family. He also planned to rebuild the Banjar royal palace using his own private fund.

Family Tree

See also 
 Banjar people

References

Former countries in Borneo
Former sultanates
Precolonial states of Indonesia
Islamic states in Indonesia
Banjar
Banjar